Sudzha is a town and the administrative center of Sudzhansky District in Kursk Oblast, Russia, located on the Sudzha and Olyoshnya Rivers  southwest of Kursk, the administrative center of the oblast. Population:

History
It was founded in 1664 as a part of the system of fortifications defending the southern approaches to Moscow. During World War II, Sudzha was occupied by German troops from October 18, 1941 to March 3, 1943.

Administrative and municipal status
Within the framework of administrative divisions, Sudzha serves as the administrative center of Sudzhansky District. As an administrative division, it is incorporated within Sudzhansky District as the town of district significance of Sudzha. As a municipal division, the town of district significance of Sudzha is incorporated within Sudzhansky Municipal District as Sudzha Urban Settlement.

References

Notes

Sources

Cities and towns in Kursk Oblast
Sudzhansky Uyezd
1664 establishments in Russia
Populated places in Sudzhansky District